White Fang is a 1991 American Northern period adventure drama film directed by Randal Kleiser, starring Ethan Hawke, Klaus Maria Brandauer and Seymour Cassel. Based on Jack London's 1906 novel White Fang, it tells the story of the friendship between a young Klondike gold prospector and a wolfdog. White Fang is portrayed by a wolfdog, Jed, who also appeared in such films as The Thing (1982) and The Journey of Natty Gann (1985). The film was released on January 18, 1991, by Buena Vista Pictures. A sequel to the film, White Fang 2: Myth of the White Wolf, was released in 1994.

Plot

In 1896, during the Klondike Gold Rush, a young explorer named Jack Conroy arrives in Alaska from San Francisco to look for his deceased father's mining claim. He meets Clarence "Skunker" Thurston and Alex Larson, two mushers who reluctantly agree to guide him. While on their journey, they are stalked by a pack of wolves. One night, while resting at a campfire, a wolf lures one of the sled dogs away from the group. Another wolf then chases the dog into the woods. Skunker tries to save his dog and is killed by the pack. Later that night, the wolves return but are scared off by Jack and Alex using burning branches. The following morning, the wolves attack the two men, but they are saved when another sled team arrives. In the ensuing fight, a female wolf is mortally shot. The wolf hobbles back to her den, and her cub remains by her side. She eventually dies, leaving the pup to fend for himself. Jack and Alex reach a town where they plan to stay for the winter. A band of Native Americans, meanwhile, find the pup, and the chief, realizing he is a wolfdog (a hybrid of a wolf and dog) from the color of his teeth, names him White Fang.

As spring comes, Jack and Alex resume their quest, but stop off at the Native Americans' settlement. The chief explains that White Fang has been raised to obey, not to be friendly, but Jack seeks to change that. Jack's chance comes when he is attacked by a grizzly bear, who chases him until he takes cover under a woodpile. White Fang, seeing Jack in danger, intervenes and holds the bear at bay rather than fighting it while standing his ground against the animal who gives up and leaves, saving Jack's life in the process. Jack and Alex later leave the settlement. Not long after, White Fang is unfairly traded to Beauty Smith, a brutal dogfighter  who previously stole Jack's money; he blackmails the Native American for the wolfdog, saying that ownership of a wild animal is considered illegal. Smith and his gang train and abuse White Fang into becoming a vicious killing machine in order to enter him into illegal dogfights. White Fang eventually meets his match in a brutal fight against a bulldog, but Jack happens upon the fight and intervenes in the nick of time. Having earlier reached his father's claim and begun the work of digging for gold, Jack returns with White Fang to the cabin, seeking to transform White Fang's vicious and territorial nature.

Jack's attempts to tame White Fang eventually succeed, and the two develop a close bond. Alex and Jack mine for gold, striking it rich with the help of White Fang. One morning, Jack travels to town to claim proper ownership of the gold when Luke notices White Fang. Seeking retaliation and planning to steal the gold for himself, Smith and his men attack the cabin site with guns and explosives. White Fang attacks Tinker, who accidentally discharges his gun and wounds Luke. White Fang eventually subdues Smith until he is ordered by Jack to back down. Jack and Alex take Smith and his men prisoner and force them at gunpoint to haul gold ore into town.

Alex and his wife, Belinda, offer to take Jack back to San Francisco, but he lets Jack know that city life is no place for a wolf; he must let White Fang run free in the wild. Though White Fang cannot understand why Jack is trying to leave him, Jack's efforts by using a stick (which is White Fang's worst fear when he was under Smith) finally succeed in scaring the wolfdog off. Later, just as he is boarding the ship back to San Francisco, Jack realizes that his rightful place is in the Yukon and decides to stay behind alone and live off the land; Alex congratulates him by saying that it is what Jack's father would have wanted. After a short time, White Fang returns to the cabin site and happily reunites with Jack.

Cast

Production
The Walt Disney Company began filming on February 26, 1990, and officially ended this cinematic production five months later. Bart the Bear and the timber wolves were trained by professional employees of Heber City, Utah's Wasatch Rocky Mountain Wildlife.

Reception

Critical reception
The film received mixed-to-positive reviews. On the review aggregator Rotten Tomatoes, the film holds an approval rating of 67% from 21 critics, with an average score of 5.80/10. The site's critical consensus states, "This glossy edition of White Fang shaves off the rough-hewn edges that made Jack London's epic story so distinct, but gorgeous photography and heartfelt performances make this an appealing adventure." On Metacritic the film has a weighed average score of 62 out of 100 based on 17 reviews, indicating “generally favorable reviews". Roger Ebert of the Chicago Sun-Times gave the film three stars out of four. He described it as a film that "holds the natural world in wonder and awe", and praised the actors' "authentic and understated” performances as well as the "magnificently photographed” cinematography.

Box office
The film was produced on a budget of $14 million and grossed $34,793,160 in the United States and Canada. The film was also a particularly large box office hit in France where it had 3,501,373 admissions and a gross of over 35 million French Franc ($6 million), becoming the fourth highest-grossing film of 1991.

Award
 Genesis Award for Feature Film – Family in 1993.

References

External links
  
 
 
 
 
 

1990s adventure drama films
1991 drama films
1991 films
American adventure drama films
1990s English-language films
Films about animal cruelty
Films about dogs
Films about friendship
Films based on American novels
Films based on White Fang
Films directed by Randal Kleiser
Films scored by Basil Poledouris
Films set in 1896
Films set in Alaska
Films set in the Arctic
Films set in Yukon
Films shot in Alaska
Grizzly bears in popular culture
Films about mining
Mushing films
Northern (genre) films
Walt Disney Pictures films
Films about wolves
1990s American films

ja:白牙#映画